Builth Wells railway station, in Llanelwedd Powys Wales was opened as Builth station on 21 September 1864 by the Mid-Wales Railway, although excursions ran on 19 and 20 September. It was renamed Builth Wells station in 1865 and served the town of Builth Wells. The station closed in 1962.

It should not be confused with Builth Road railway station (around two miles (3.5 km) northwest of Builth Wells) which still has train services.

References

Further reading

Disused railway stations in Powys
Railway stations in Great Britain opened in 1864
Railway stations in Great Britain closed in 1962
Former Cambrian Railway stations